Impuls Football Club, is a defunct Armenian professional football club from the town of Dilijan, Tavush Province. The club used to play in the Armenian Premier League, the top division of the Armenian football. The home ground of Impuls was the Dilijan City Stadium.

History
Impulse FC was originally founded in 1985 during the Soviet days. In 1994, the club was dissolved due to financial difficulties.

In 2009, Impuls FC was revived by the efforts of former member of Armenian Parliament Hakob Hakobyan, as part of the Sport Club Erebuni Dilijan. Based in the town of Dilijan, The home ground of the club was the Dilijan City Stadium. However Impuls played but their latest season at the Armenian football league at the Ayg Stadium of Ararat.

However, the club was dissolved in May 2013, by the decision of the owners.

League record

Managers 
 Hrachik Khachmanukyan (1982–91)
 Vladimir Ovakimyan (1991–93)
 Stepan Bagdasaryan (2009)
 Varuzhan Sukiasyan (2010)
 Armen Gyulbudaghyants (Jan 2011 – May 13)

References

Defunct football clubs in Armenia
Association football clubs established in 1985
Association football clubs disestablished in 2013
1985 establishments in Armenia
2013 disestablishments in Armenia
Dilijan